Naturally is the debut studio album by J. J. Cale released on October 25, 1971.

Background
Cale, who was raised in Oklahoma, first tasted success in 1964 when singer Mel McDaniel scored a regional hit with Cale's composition "Lazy Me". From there Cale moved to California and worked at Leon Russell's home studio as a chief engineer and began performing at places like the Whisky a Go Go. With Johnny Rivers already performing there regularly, club co-owner Elmer Valentine rechristened Cale as J.J. Cale to avoid confusion with the John Cale in the Velvet Underground. In 1966, Cale cut an unsuccessful single for Liberty Records called "Slow Motion", but it was the B-side, "After Midnight", that would have long-term ramifications for Cale's career when Eric Clapton recorded the song and had a Top 20 hit. Cale, who was languishing in obscurity at the time, had no knowledge of Clapton's recording of "After Midnight" until it became a radio hit in 1970. Cale recalled to Mojo magazine that when he heard Clapton's version playing on his radio, "I was dirt poor, not making enough to eat and I wasn't a young man. I was in my thirties, so I was very happy. It was nice to make some money." Cale's friend and producer, Audie Ashworth, encouraged Cale to record a full album in order to capitalize on the success of his song.

Recording
Naturally was recorded independently, "on spec," the musicians being paid demo fees. The ingredients that went into that project, with subtle drum rhythms, murky vocals sung in a narrow range, and a guitar style that merged country, blues and jazz, established the template for the "Tulsa sound". Some songs, such as "Call Me the Breeze", were recorded with primitive drum machine accompaniment and sound almost like demos. Cale explained to Dan Forte of Vintage Guitar in 2004, "When we did the first album, most people didn't realize that was an electric drum machine – or that there even was such a thing. I didn't use a real drummer because I had no money. So I cut 'Crazy Mama' and 'Call Me The Breeze', and Carl Radle came in and played bass, and Mac Gayden played slide on 'Crazy Mama'. Then Audie hired some musicians and a real studio, and we cut the other eight songs on Naturally."  The album showcased Cale's distinctive, understated style, and it successfully established his solo recording career, which continued until his death in 2013.

Cale's version of "After Midnight" differs greatly from Clapton's frenetic version, which is itself based on Cale's own arrangement. The Oklahoma Troubadour explained in 2004:

In the 2005 documentary To Tulsa and Back, Cale admitted, "I wasn't real crazy about the Naturally album and I'm still not, but most of the people who like my music, J.J. Cale fans, really like the Naturally album. I think what they liked really was the songs." In the same documentary, Cale recalls producer and agent Audie Ashworth calling him saying if he appeared on Dick Clark's American Bandstand, the single "Crazy Mama" would jump into the Top 10 on the charts, but Cale refused when he learned he would have to lip sync to the recording of the song.  While "Crazy Mama" nearly cracked the Top 20, Cale was unimpressed with fame right from the beginning, telling Steve Newton of The Georgia Straight in 1990:

In 2009 the album was re-released, with Really, as a French exclusive 24-track 2-CD album set, as part of Universal Records' "2 For 1" series.

Reception

The album contained the 1972 hits "Crazy Mama" (#22 on the Billboard Hot 100, his only Top 40 hit) and "After Midnight" (#42) as well as turntable hits "Bringing it Back" (recorded by Kansas for their first album), "Call Me the Breeze" (later recorded by Lynyrd Skynyrd), and "Clyde" (later recorded by Dr. Hook & the Medicine Show and a 1980 country hit for Waylon Jennings). "Crazy Mama" was actually the B-side of the single, "Magnolia", but a DJ in Little Rock, Arkansas played it in preference to the A-side, facilitating its success. Reviewing the LP for Rolling Stone in 1972, Jon Landau said, "This quiet and leisurely album from an excellent guitarist, vocalist, and songwriter is a charmer. J.J. Cale has a unique approach to funk, blues, and country and all it involves is taking things at just as relaxed and mellow a pace as the human metabolism will allow. Here it results in one of the most enjoyable debut albums heard in some time." Village Voice critic Robert Christgau was less receptive to the "lassitude affected" by Cale and his collaborators. In Christgau's Record Guide: Rock Albums of the Seventies (1981), he said that while "Call Me the Breeze" and "Crazy Mama" are "absolutely beguiling", the rest of the record's "murmured blues meditations are so easy on the spirit that even though they have their charms they invite the mistrust of moralizers like myself—there's just too much talent here to justify such slight results." Thom Owens of AllMusic later wrote that "Cale effortlessly captured a lazy, rolling boogie that contradicted all the commercial styles of boogie, blues, and country rock at the time" of the album's release.

Track listing 
All songs written by JJ Cale.

Side one
 "Call Me the Breeze"  – 2:38
 "Call the Doctor"  – 2:26
 "Don't Go to Strangers"  – 2:22
 "Woman I Love"  – 2:40
 "Magnolia"  – 3:23
 "Clyde" – 2:29

Side two
 "Crazy Mama"  – 2:31
 "Nowhere to Run"  – 2:26
 "After Midnight"  – 2:25
 "River Runs Deep"  – 2:42
 "Bringing It Back"  – 2:46
 "Crying Eyes"  – 3:15

Personnel

Musicians

 J. J. Cale – guitar, vocals
 Karl Himmel – drums ( A1, A2, A4 - B2, B4 - B6 )
 Chuck Browning – drums ( A3, B3 )
 Tim Drummond – bass ( A4 - A6, B2, B5 )
 Carl Radle – bass ( A1, A2, B1, B4, B6 )
 Norbert Putnam – bass ( A3, B3 )
 Bob Wilson – piano ( A4 - A6, B2, B5 )
 David Briggs – piano, organ
 Jerry Whitehurst – piano
 Weldon Myrick – steel guitar ( A1, A2, B1, B4
 Buddy Spicher – fiddle
 Shorty Lavender – fiddle
 Walter Hayness – dobro
 Mac Gayden – slide guitar ( B1, B4 )
 Ed Colis – harmonica
 Diane Davidson – backing vocals

Production
 Cover artwork - Rabon
 Engineer – James Long

References

External links 
 

1971 debut albums
J. J. Cale albums
Shelter Records albums
Albums produced by Audie Ashworth